Margaret Hellyer (born 29 July 1937) is an Australian former tennis player.

Active in the 1950s and 1960s, Hellyer is a native of Sydney and had some of her best results on the grass courts of Wimbledon. She won the All England Plate in 1957 and was a mixed doubles semi-finalist that year with Roy Emerson. Her best singles run was a fourth round appearance in 1960 and she twice reached the women's doubles quarter-finals.

Personal life
Hellyer had a relationship with Brazilian tennis player Carlos Fernandes and the pair were engaged. She was married to Kenneth Burston, an Englishman from Shropshire, in a 1963 wedding in Sydney.

References

1937 births
Living people
Australian female tennis players
Tennis players from Sydney